Saki Kanazawa (born 17 September 1976) is a Japanese table tennis player. Her highest career ITTF ranking was 23.

References

1976 births
Living people
Japanese female table tennis players
Table tennis players at the 2006 Asian Games